Gusyata is a rural locality (a village) in Gamovskoye Rural Settlement, Permsky District, Perm Krai, Russia. The population was 5 as of 2010.

Geography 
Gusyata is located 22 km southwest of Perm (the district's administrative centre) by road. Strashnaya is the nearest rural locality.

References 

Rural localities in Permsky District